Western tradition can refer to:

Western culture
Western mystery tradition
The Western Tradition, a 1989 television series of lectures by Eugen Weber
American Tradition Partnership, a political organization also known as Western Tradition Partnership
Western Tradition Partnership, Inc. v. Attorney General of Montana, a United States Supreme Court case regarding campaign finance